Hastedt may refer to:

 Hastedt (Bremen), subdistrict in Bremen, Germany
 Culver Hastedt (1884 – 1966), U.S. sprinter and Olympic Gold Medalist in 1904